South Dakota Highway 109 (SD 109) is a  state highway in Grant and Roberts counties in South Dakota, United States, runs along the south side of Big Stone Lake and the Minnesota border from U.S. Route 12 in Big Stone City to South Dakota Highway 15.

Route description
SD 109 begins at an intersection with US 12 in Big Stone City. It immediately crosses a bridge spanning railroad tracks and it heads northwest out of town. It ends at a 90-degree bend in SD 15 east of Hartford Beach State Park.

History
SD 109 was originally designated Highway 15Y. It was renumbered to 109 in 1975.

Major intersections

See also

References

External links

 South Dakota Highways Page: Highways 1-30

109
Transportation in Grant County, South Dakota
Transportation in Roberts County, South Dakota